The 1996 Soul Train Music Awards was held on March 29, 1996, at the Shrine Auditorium in Los Angeles, California. The show honored the best in R&B, soul, rap, jazz, and gospel music from the previous year. The show was hosted by Brandy, LL Cool J and Anita Baker.

Special awards

Heritage Award for Career Achievement
 Patti LaBelle

Sammy Davis Jr. Award for Entertainer of the Year
 Boyz II Men

Winners and nominees
Winners are in bold text.

R&B/Soul Album of the Year – Male
 D'Angelo – Brown Sugar
 Michael Jackson– HIStory: Past, Present and Future, Book I
 Quincy Jones – Q's Jook Joint
 Brian McKnight – I Remember You

R&B/Soul Album of the Year – Female
 Mary J. Blige – My Life
 Mariah Carey – Daydream
 Faith Evans – Faith
 Monica – Miss Thang

R&B/Soul Album of the Year – Group, Band or Duo
TLC – CrazySexyCool
Jodeci – The Show, The After Party, The Hotel
Solo – Solo
Xscape – Off the Hook

Best R&B/Soul Single – Male
 D'Angelo – "Brown Sugar"
 Michael Jackson – "You Are Not Alone"
 Montell Jordan – "This Is How We Do It"
 Seal – "Kiss from a Rose"

Best R&B/Soul Single – Female
 Whitney Houston – "Exhale (Shoop Shoop)"
 Mary J. Blige – "I'm Going Down"
 Brandy – "Brokenhearted"
 Monica – "Like This and Like That" / "Before You Walk Out of My Life"

Best R&B/Soul Single – Group, Band, or Duo
 TLC – "Waterfalls"
 Boyz II Men – "Water Runs Dry"
 Groove Theory – "Tell Me"
 Jodeci – "Love U 4 Life"

R&B/Soul or Rap Song of the Year
 The Notorious B.I.G. – "One More Chance"
 Whitney Houston – "Exhale (Shoop Shoop)"
 Method Man  – "I'll Be There for You/You're All I Need to Get By"
 TLC – "Waterfalls"

Best R&B/Soul or Rap Music Video
 TLC – "Waterfalls"
 Coolio  – "Gangsta's Paradise"
 Dr. Dre – "Keep Their Heads Ringin'"
 Michael Jackson and Janet Jackson – "Scream"

Best R&B/Soul or Rap New Artist
 D'Angelo
 Faith Evans
 Junior M.A.F.I.A.
 Monica

Best Rap Album
 2Pac – Me Against The World
 Bone Thugs-N-Harmony – E. 1999 Eternal
 Coolio – Gangsta's Paradise
 Method Man – Tical

Best Jazz Album
 Quincy Jones – Q's Jook Joint
 Boney James – Seduction
 Keiko Matsui – Sapphire
 Pat Metheny Group – We Live Here

Best Gospel Album
 The New Life Community Choir Featuring John P. Kee – Show Up
 Yolanda Adams – More Than a Melody
 Shirley Caesar – He Will Come
 Kirk Franklin and the Family – Kirk Franklin and the Family

Performers
 LL Cool J – "Doin' It"
 TLC and Craig Mack – "Kick Your Game"
 Anita Baker
 Mary J. Blige – "Not Gon' Cry"
 Notorious B.I.G., Puff Daddy and Faith Evans – "One More Chance" and "Get Money"
 Patti LaBelle Tribute:
 Ronald Isley, Rachelle Ferrell, Peabo Bryson and Tamia – "If Only You Knew"
 Yolanda Adams
 Al Green – "Love and Happiness" 
 Brandy – "Sittin' Up in My Room" 
 Patti LaBelle
 The Braxtons and Jay-Z – "So Many Ways"

Soul Train Music Awards, 1996
Soul Train Music Awards
Soul
Soul
1996 in Los Angeles